Epiperipatus betheli is a species of velvet worm in the family Peripatidae. The original description of this species is based on a dark brown female specimen, 34 mm long, with 30 pairs of legs. The type locality is in Guatemala.

References

Onychophorans of tropical America
Onychophoran species
Animals described in 1913